Motera is a neighbourhood in the northwestern part of the metropolis of Ahmedabad in Gujarat, India. It lies west of the Sabarmati River. It falls under the West Zone of Ahmedabad Municipal Corporation and under the Gandhinagar South constituency of Gujarat Legislative Assembly (Vidhan Sabha) and under the Gandhinagar constituency of the Lok Sabha. The chief attraction in Motera is the world's largest sports stadium, Narendra Modi Stadium. The stadium is the venue for the international cricket matches held in Ahmedabad. In 2015, old stadium was demolished and new stadium was built which got the honour of world's largest stadium.

History
It was earlier a part of the Gandhinagar district. January 2008 onwards, it is in the limits of Ahmedabad Municipal Corporation (AMC) in the Daskroi Taluka. It is included in the West Zone as per AMC, though it is the northernmost and the closest to the twin city and the capital of the Gujarat state, Gandhinagar. Motera is on the opposite bank of Sabarmati River.

Demographics
 India census, Motera had a population of 21,150. Males constitute 55% of the population and females 45%. Motera has an average literacy rate of 74%, higher than the national average of 59.5%: male literacy is 81%, and female literacy is 67%. In Motera, 13% of the population is under 6 years of age.

Public transit

By train (Indian Railways)
Apart from main Ahmedabad Railway Station (ADI) located in Kalupur area, one can use Sabarmati railway station (SBI, Northern India trains) located in Sabarmati area adjacent to Motera, and Sabarmati railway station (SBT, Central India trains) located in Ranip area, a little far from Motera, but closer than the main station.

By state bus (GSRTC)
The state-owned bus facility, Gujarat State Road Transport Corporation, connecting various cities, towns and villages of Gujarat, runs buses to Gandhinagar from Ahmedabad and vice versa. These buses have official stops at Sabarmati Tollnaka on Visat — RTO Road and Vishwakarma Govt Engg College on Visat — Gandhinagar Highway.

By city bus (AMTS)
The oldest city bus service by Ahmedabad Municipal Transport Service (AMTS), serves Motera through stops of Motera Gaam, Sahjanand Park, Indiranagar, Gandhivaas on the Motera Stadium Road and Vishwakarma Mandir, Visat, etc. on the Visat — Gandhinagar Highway.

By city bus (BRTS)
The brand new and fast city bus service is the Bus Rapid Transit System (BRTS) by Ahmedabad Janmarg Limited (AJL). It hasn't yet penetrated inside Motera, but the stations of Visat Gandhinagar Junction, Motera Cross Roads, Sabarmati Police Station, Sabarmati Municipal Swimming Pool, Rathi Apartment (ALL are on the main Visat — RTO Road i.e., separating Sabarmati and Motera) and Vishwakarma Govt Engg College station (on Visat — Gandhinagar Highway)  belong to Line 8 towards Maninagar with RTO Circle and Bhavsar Hostel (only few stations ahead) as the junction for transfer to other lines.

By auto rickshaws
Private and sharing-based 'shuttle' auto rickshaws are always available, but they are less comfortable.

By MEGA metro rail (subway)
The Metro-Link Express for Gandhinagar and Ahmedabad is yet in planning stage and the construction of Phase-I will be over by late 2019. But it is notable that Motera will be a metro rail interchange hub. 'Motera Stadium' station will be the northern-end terminus on the north–south line of Phase-I which will consist of important stations like Sabarmati railway station, AEC, Vadaj, Income Tax, Paldi, Vasna, etc. This line will intersect the west–east line of Phase-I itself consisting of stations like Thaltej, Doordarshan Kendra, Gujarat University, Navrangpura Stadium, Relief Road, Kalupur Railway Station (Ahmedabad Central), Vastral, etc. The extension of Phase-I will see connecting 'Motera Stadium' to 'SVP Airport' via 'Koteshwar' or 'Hansol' over the Sabarmati River. Also, Phase-II will see extending MEGA services to the twin city of Ahmedabad and the capital of the Gujarat state i.e. Gandhinagar.

Gallery

References

Neighbourhoods in Ahmedabad